Sang (also known as Sang-e Sīrīz and Sang Siriz) is a village in Siriz Rural District, Yazdanabad District, Zarand County, Kerman Province, Iran. At the 2006 census, its population was 415, in 97 families.

References 

Populated places in Zarand County